The Java pipistrelle (Pipistrellus javanicus) is a species of pipistrelle bat found in South and Southeast Asia, including Afghanistan, Bangladesh, Brunei, Cambodia, China, India, Indonesia, Laos, Malaysia, Myanmar, Nepal, Pakistan, Philippines, Singapore, Thailand, and Vietnam. It favors human habitations. A 2010 research paper from the Philippines regarding the prevalence of coronaviruses in bats tested several Java pipistrelle bats.

References

Pipistrellus
Taxa named by John Edward Gray
Mammals described in 1838
Bats of Asia
Bats of Southeast Asia
Bats of Indonesia
Bats of Malaysia
Mammals of Afghanistan
Mammals of Bangladesh
Mammals of Brunei
Mammals of Cambodia
Mammals of China
Mammals of India
Mammals of Laos
Mammals of Nepal
Mammals of Pakistan
Mammals of the Philippines
Mammals of Myanmar
Mammals of Thailand
Mammals of Singapore
Mammals of Vietnam
Fauna of Java